Abdullah Yılmaz (born 6 May 1978) is a Turkish football referee.

Career
Yılmaz was born in 1978 in the Turkish city of Trabzon. He became a referee at the age of 19, inspired by his father Azmi, who was also a senior referee.

His debut as a referee in the Süper Lig gave Yılmaz on May 13, 2006 at the age of 28 years; he led the encounter Vestel Manisaspor against Konyaspor.

References

External links 
 
 
 

Turkish football referees
Sportspeople from Trabzon
1978 births
Living people